Hino  is a village in Kanepi Parish, Põlva County in southeastern Estonia.

Sculptor August Weizenberg (1837–1921), was born in Ritsike tavern in Hino village.

References

Villages in Põlva County